Wes James, better known by his stage name Le Youth, is an American electronic musician, DJ, and producer. He is known for combining R&B with 90's house music and he had a monthly radio show called Le Youth's Friday Night House Party on Capital Xtra. James was raised in Toledo, Ohio and currently resides in Los Angeles, California.

Music career

2013-present: Breakthrough
Le Youth gained attention on the internet when his track "Cool" featuring a sample from Cassie Ventura's Me & U rapidly received over 200,000 plays on SoundCloud in a short period of time. The single was picked up by Ultra Records and the Cool EP was released on July 2, 2013. The music video for the song was directed by Renata Raksha and was released on April 9, 2013. On July 22, 2013 "Cool" was selected as the Record of the Week on BBC Radio 1.

Discography

Singles

References

Footnotes
A  "Cool" did not enter the Ultratop 50, but peaked at number 10 on the Flemish Ultratip chart, the top-100 songs which haven't made the Ultratop 50..
B  "Dance With Me" did not enter the Ultratop 50, but peaked at number 42 on the Flemish Ultratip chart, the top-100 songs which haven't made the Ultratop 50..

Sources

External links

American electronic musicians
Living people
1985 births